Dr. Salim Mehmud, also known as Salim Mehmood, is a Pakistani rocket scientist and a nuclear engineer. He is the former chairman of Space and Upper Atmosphere Research Commission (SUPARCO). He has served as chief scientist at the Defence Science and Technology Organization. Currently, he is the chief Scientific and Technological Advisor at the Ministry of Communications of Pakistan.

Education
Mehmud took his BSc in Physics and a BA in Mathematics in 1955 from the Punjab University. The same year, he was admitted at the Punjab University's Graduate Program, and continued his research in Physics. He graduated and received his MSc in Physics and Electronics from Punjab University in 1957. The same year, he joined Pakistan Atomic Energy Commission (PAEC) as Engineer Officer (EO) and served in Nuclear Engineering Division. However, he was awarded a scholarship by former Chairman of PAEC Nazir Ahmad to continue his higher studies, and travelled to United States.

There, he attended North Carolina State University where he received his double MSc in Physics and MS in Electrical engineering in 1959. The same year, he began his post-graduate research work at Oak Ridge Institute for Science and Education which he did until 1961. In 1964, he studied Nuclear engineering with the Oak Ridge Institute for Science and Education (ORISE), also at the Oak Ridge National Laboratory as part of the Atoms for Peace Program In 1961, he took his MSc in Nuclear engineering, followed by PhD in Nuclear engineering from Oak Ridge National Laboratory under the supervision of Dr. William "Bill" Nelson in 1964.

While studying at Oak Ridge National Laboratory, his mentor Dr. Bill Nelson has called him one of his brightest and finest students in his doctoral teaching experience. His doctoral dissertation covered a vast amount of study in the field of Nuclear electric rocket.

NASA career 
Mehmud who was working at an Oak Ridge National Laboratory as a nuclear engineer was asked by Dr. Ishrat Hussain Usmani to go to Pakistani Embassy at the Washington, D.C., and met with Professor Abdus Salam. He along with fellow nuclear engineer Tariq Mustafa arrived at the Pakistani Embassy at Washington, D.C. After the formal conversation, Professor Salam and the engineers went to a local restaurant where the engineers was personally asked by Professor Abdus Salam to join NASA.

According to his interview, Mehmud expressed his concern over joining NASA and clearly notified Abdus Salam about his willingness to work in Pakistan's nuclear industry. However, with Salam's insistence, Mehmud and Mustafa visited NASA's headquarter and examined the American advances in rocket technology. The rocket science was found to be more challenging than it seems, according to Mehmud. After his visit to NASA, Mehmud and Mustafa decided to join NASA to study and trained in the field of rocket science.

Role in the development of NASA's solid rockets

Mehmud and Mustafa were assigned to conduct research in space and rocket technology. They, at first, declined the Salam's offer and vowed to work in a Pakistan's nuclear program, according to the interview given by CNBC Pakistan. However, after Abdus Salam's insistence, Mehmud and Mustafa visited the Goddard Space Flight Center. After the visit, Mustafa and Mehmud agreed to work for NASA. Mehmud and Mustafa arrived at Greenbelt, Maryland on a Douglas DC-6. Mehmud and Mustafa joined NASA in 1961. He was trained at the Goddard Space Center in rocket technology. He was the one of the earliest pioneers of Nike-Cajun and Judi-Dart, a solid fuel propellent based rocket. He closely collaborated with NASA scientists and engineers in the development of solid fuel sounding rockets during the 1960s.

SUPARCO career and chairman 

Mehmud joined SUPARCO in 1961 on the request of Abdus Salam. He was immediately transferred in SUPARCO's rocket fabrication laboratory. Mehmud was one of the distinguished member of SUPARCO's team who launched the Satellite Launch Vehicle technology based-Rehbar-I under the direction of Air Cdre. dr. Wladysław Józef Marian Turowicz. He then was sent back to NASA where he specialised in satellite and rocket technology. He then travelled with Air Cdre. Wladyslaw Turowicz to the United States where both had studied and conduct research in space and rocket technology. Mehmud came back to Pakistan where he carried out his research in rocket science and satellite launch vehicles under the supervision of Wladyslaw Turowicz. Along with Turowicz, he sat the Sonmiani facility and was the responsible for installing the Launch pads and computer facility at the Sonmiani center.

On 15 December 1980, with the support of PAEC Chairman Munir Ahmad Khan, President of Pakistan General Zia appointed Salim Mehmud as chief executive officer of SUPARCO and asked him to submit necessary recommendations for up-gradation of SUPARCO to the status of a full-fledged Commission.

Hatf missile program
In 1980, he was made the Chairman of SUPARCO with the support of PAEC chairman Munir Ahmad Khan. He successfully convinced General Zia to set up funds for SUPARCO. Zia who was a strong advocate for the space program, allowed SUPARCO to developed the indigenous satellite capabilities. During the 1980s, he started the Hatf Missile Program and was the project director of the Missile program. He was the principal figure and scientist in Hatf missile program and was the brain behind the indigenous missile development. As a profession, Mehmud is a nuclear engineer, and designed the missile in a complex model that the rocket can carry approximately up to 500 kg HEU fissile material. It was his leadership that in 1989, 23 March, on the Republic Day of Pakistan, SUPARCO, along with Engineering Research Laboratories, publicly tested the Hatf Missile.

Design of Hatf 
The Hatf-I, the first derivative, was designed as a highly mobile, tactical system. The missiles are said to have been derived from the second-stage of the French Eridan missile system. Due to difficulty in acquiring the technology needed in satellite development in the 1980s, the first derivative of Hatf missile is designed with zero or no satellite guidance. Dr. Mehmud's team also designed the missile that it can be considered as an artillery rocket. It is ground mobile and can be launched from a transporter erector launcher (TEL) vehicles.

Badr satellite program 

In 1984, Salim Mehmud quickly launched the Badr satellite program. The development and the construction of Badr-1, Pakistan's first domestically-built digital communication satellite, was started. A small team of SUPARCO scientists and engineers who had studied and trained in University of Surrey were the part of the university's UO-9, UO-11 and UO-22 hamsat miniature satellite development and program, began the development of the satellite. Mehmud, then briefed the General Zia and suggested to launch the satellite from Pakistani Satellite Launch Vehicle. However, having found difficulties in SLV-required technology, the idea of Pakistani SLV was postponed and later was cancelled. Mehmud retired from SUPARCO in 1989 as a chief scientist and was transferred in DESTO. In 1990, Badr-1 was finally launched via Long March 2E rocket from Xichang Satellite Launch Center.

Support for rocket science in Pakistan 
Mehmud has been a vocal supporter of rocket science and technology in Pakistan. He, along with other scientists, has raised his voice in different occasion for Pakistan's space program as well as a Pakistan's satellite launch vehicle project. His efforts were involved in Pakistan's pursuit for peaceful use of satellite technology and has been a strong supporter of science in Pakistan.

Legacy 
Mehmud's profile has been kept in secrecy but it is known that he has work in Pakistan's aerospace weapon development program agency, DESTO. It is unknown whether how long did he stay there and when was he took his retirement from the agency. However, it is known that he has played a "father-like" role in the establishment of the Sonmiani and Tilla spaceports and have been a scientist behind the Pakistan's solid-fuel rocket firing program during the 1960s.

Along with other Pakistani scientists, Mehmud's profile and credits have been kept in high level of ambiguity. Mehmud's credit and work, such as other noted Pakistani scientists, have kept lower than Dr. Abdul Qadeer Khan. Currently, he has been retired from Pakistan's strategic program and remained untouch to the other Pakistan's classified program. As of 2009, he is the chief Scientific and Technological Advisor at the Ministry of Communications of Pakistan.

Research papers
 Pakistan's Space Programme, by Salim Mehmud, published as a part of Space Policy in August 1989.
 Pakistan and Earth Observation System, by Salim Mehmud.
 Pakistan and Geostationary satellites, by Salim Mehmud

References

External links 

University of the Punjab alumni
Pakistani nuclear physicists
Pakistani aerospace engineers
Pakistani scientists
Pakistani scholars
Pakistani nuclear engineers
North Carolina State University alumni
Project-706
Recipients of Sitara-i-Imtiaz
Space and Upper Atmosphere Research Commission people
Living people
Pakistan Army civilians
Administrators of the Space and Upper Atmosphere Research Commission
Rocket scientists
Year of birth missing (living people)
Aerospace engineers